The 1925 San Jose State Spartans football team represented State Teachers College at San Jose during the 1925 college football season.

San Jose State competed in the California Coast Conference (CCC). The team was led by second-year head coach Ernesto R. Knollin, and they played home games at Spartan Field in San Jose, California. The team finished the season with a record of two wins and five losses (2–5, 2–4 CCC). The Spartans were outscored by their opponents 69–158 for the season.

Schedule

Notes

References

San Jose State
San Jose State Spartans football seasons
San Jose State Spartans football